Pandit Shankar Ghosh (10 October 1935 – 22 January 2016) was an Indian tabla player from the Farukhabad gharana of Hindustani classical music. He was an occasional Hindustani classical singer where he followed the Patiala gharana.

He was awarded the 1999-2000 Sangeet Natak Akademi Award in Tabla, the highest Indian recognition given to practicing artists, by Sangeet Natak Akademi, India's National Academy of Music, Dance & Drama.

He was at the ICU of the super-speciality hospital on E M Bypass, since mid-December and underwent angioplasty on 14 December 2015. He had been admitted to the hospital following heart ailments, was in coma for past 40 days and died on 22 January 2016.

Early life and training
He started learning training taleem in 1953 under Jnan Prakash Ghosh of Calcutta (now Kolkata), who pioneered the concept of tabla ensembles, which employed numerous tabla players playing the same pieces; a tradition later taken forward by Shankar himself.

Career
He started touring the US in 1960s with sarod maestro, Ustad Ali Akbar Khan and won rave reviews, and over the years he toured with Pandit Ravi Shankar, Ustad Vilayat Khan, Pandit Nikhil Banerjee, Sharan Rani, Pandit V. G. Jog. In India he has performed with vocalists such as Ustad Bade Ghulam Ali Khan, Pandit Omkarnath Thakur, Pandit  Vinayakrao Patwardhan, Girija Devi and Smt. Akhtari Bai. During his stay abroad he also collaborated with artists like Greg Ellis, Pete Lockett and John Bergamo.

He has received awards like ITC Sangeet Research Academy award and the Ustad Hafiz Ali Khan award. Teaching tabla over three decades, he has taught in institutions at Kolkata, Paris and Bonn.

Personal life
He was married to Hindustani classical vocalist of Patiala gharana, Sanjukta Ghosh, and was the father of the tabla maestro Bickram Ghosh, whom he has also trained in tabla, and who went on to perform with Ali Akbar Khan and Ravi Shankar.

See also
Zakir Hussain
Chandra Nath Shastri
Anindo Chatterjee
Swapan Chaudhuri
Kumar Bose
Yogesh Samsi
Ananda Gopal Bandopadhyay

References

External links
 Shankar Ghosh profile

Tabla players
1935 births
2016 deaths
Indian male classical musicians
Indian percussionists
Bengali musicians
Hindustani instrumentalists
Recipients of the Sangeet Natak Akademi Award
Musicians from Kolkata
World music percussionists
Patiala gharana